The Joe A. Callaway Award for Civic Courage is presented annually by The Shafeek Nader Trust for the Community Interest. The Callaway Award "recognizes individuals who take a public stance to advance truth and justice, at some personal risk". The award was established by in 1990 by Joe Callaway to recognize "individuals in any area of endeavor who, with integrity and at some personal risk, take a public stance to advance truth and justice, and who challenged prevailing conditions in pursuit of the common good."

The first recipient of the award was Joseph A. Kinney, of the National Safe Workplace in Chicago, who was credited for his fearless advocacy of safety for America's workers.

In 2006 the Sharon Shaffer, Charlie Swift and Bunnatine Greenhouse were awarded the prize. Shaffer and Swift were military officers who vigorously defended Guantanamo captives before Guantanamo military commissions. Greenhouse was a contracting officer employed by the US Army Corps of Engineers, who exposed financial improprieties.

In 2007, award recipients were: Dahr Jamail (independent journalist in Iraq) and Linda Peeno, M.D., (whistleblower and patient advocate).

In 2012, the award was shared by William Binney & J. Kirk Wiebe for their work on Government Data Centers & Spying on Citizens, as well as John Kiriakou for his work on the Government's Torture Policy.

Past winners

1990
Joe A. Kinney,
Marie Cirillio

1991
Roldo Bartimole,
Thomas E. Gish and Patricia Ann Burnett Gish,
Forrest (Frosty) Troy and Helen B. Troy

1992
Karl Z. Morgan,
Robert D. Pollard,
Mary P. Sinclair

1993
William J. Lehman,
William Reid,
Terri Swearingen

1994
Robert Bigham,
Julie Boyd,
Roger Crisafi,
Von Marie Erkert,
Sherene Lee Jennings,
James Keefer,
Thomas Vernon Russell Jr.,
Dennis Shrader,
Steven Craig Slagowski,
Joseph A. Villarreal,
Carroll E. Cox,
Allan Nairn

1995
Lance Hughes,
Steven W. Jones,
Agnes Mulroy

1996
John Brodeur,
Janet Chandler,
Peter Gunn Montague

1997
Merrell Williams,
Stanton Glantz

1998
Jane Akre,
Steve Wilson,
David F. Noble

1999
Roberta Baskin,
Nancy Olivieri,
Martha L. Crouch

2000
Doris Haddock,
Paul E. Farmer

2001
Anthony Mazzocchi,
Amy Goodman

2002
Barry Commoner,
Herbert L. Needleman

2003
John Munsell,
Theodore A. Postol

2004
David Graham,
Mark Livingston

2005
Bunny Greenhouse,
Lieutenant Colonel Sharon A. Shaffer,
Lieutenant Commander Charles D. Swift

2006
John Thayer,
Thomas Baker,
Frank Binns,
Martin R. Blanchet,
Edward J. Hill,
Richard Leonard,
Charles Morris,
Christian Raley,
Scott Smith,
Timothy Taylor,
Maria Gunnoe,
Edward (Ed) Wiley

2007
Dahr Jamail,
Linda Peeno

2008
Michael German,
Barbara Bailey,
Peter Chase,
George Christian,
Jan Nocek

2009
Frances Crowe,
Ivor Van Heerden

2010
Becky A. McClain,
Percy and Louise Schmeiser

2011
Concepcion Picciotto,
Harry Kelber

2012
William Binney & J. Kirk Wiebe,
John Kiriakou

2013
Ramsey Clark (lawyer, U.S. Attorney General [1967-69], antiwar campaigner, defender of due process and the rule of law), 
Saul Landau (human rights activist, journalist, filmmaker)

2014
Marcy Benstock,
Dinesh Thakur

2015
John Crane,
James Love and Manon Ress,
Jonathan G. Lundgren

2016
Whistleblowers for the Common Good,
Robert MacLean,
Larry Criscione

2017
Joel Clement,
Megan Rice, Michael R. Walli, and Greg Boertje-Obed

2018
Sandra C. Black,
John Slowik

References

External links 

 

American awards
Courage awards
Whistleblower support organizations